Scott Joss (born 1962) is a songwriter, guitarist, mandolin player, singer, and fiddle player primarily in the American Country music tradition who has performed with Merle Haggard, Dwight Yoakam, Pete Anderson, Tiny Moore, Roy Nichols, Dusty Wakeman, Kris Kristofferson and Jana Jae and is a successful solo artist.

Career
Born in Santa Monica, California in 1962 and raised in Redding, California, Joss learned to play fiddle from Jana Jae, the one-time wife and fiddle player for Buck Owens and his Buckaroos.  Praised as "the heir to the Bakersfield throne" because of his early association with Bakersfield Sound musicians, Joss' playing has been key to hit tunes scored by Merle Haggard & The Strangers and Dwight Yoakam.

Scott Joss

Discography

Solo
 1996: Souvenirs (Little Dog)
 2000: A New Reason to Care (Little Dog)
2018: How Far to Jordan (Miracle Mile Records) The album has tracks that feature Kris Kristofferson

With Dwight Yoakam
 1988: Dwight Yoakam – Buenas Noches from a Lonely Room  (Reprise)
 1990: Dwight Yoakam – If There Was a Way (Reprise)
 1993: Dwight Yoakam – This Time (Reprise)
 1995: Dwight Yoakam – Gone (Reprise)
 1995: Dwight Yoakam – Dwight Live (Reprise)
 1997: Dwight Yoakam – Under the Covers (Reprise)
 1997: Dwight Yoakam – Come on Christmas (Reprise)
 1998: Dwight Yoakam – A Long Way Home (Reprise)
 2000: Dwight Yoakam – Tomorrow's Sounds Today (Reprise)
 2001: Dwight Yoakam – South of Heaven, West of Hell (Warner Bros.)
 2003: Dwight Yoakam – Population Me (Audium)

With Merle Haggard
 2003: Merle Haggard – Haggard Like Never Before (Hag Records)
 2005: Merle Haggard – Chicago Wind (Capitol)
 2007: Merle Haggard – The Bluegrass Sessions (McCoury Music)
 2010: Merle Haggard – I Am What I Am (Vanguard)
 2011: Merle Haggard – Working in Tennessee (Vanguard)

References

External links 
 
 
Scott Joss has a Fan Group on Facebook 

1962 births
American country fiddlers
Country musicians from California
Living people
The Strangers (American band) members